The Poacher 21, also called the Parker Dawson Poacher, is an American trailerable sailboat that was designed by W. Richardson as a racer-cruiser and first built in 1980.

Production
The design was built by Parker Dawson Yachts in Hingham, Massachusetts, United States from 1979 until 1984, with about 50 boats completed, but it is now out of production.

Design
The Poacher 21 is a recreational keelboat, built predominantly of fiberglass, with wood trim. It has an unstayed cat-rigged ketch rig, a raked stem, a plumb transom, a transom-hung rudder controlled by a tiller and a lifting keel. It displaces  and carries  of ballast.

The two masts are identical, with the aft one mounted slightly lower. The sails are equipped with luff sleeves, rather than halyards. Both sails have wishbone booms. The sails are identical and interchangeable.

The boat is normally fitted with a small  outboard motor for docking and maneuvering.

The design has sleeping accommodation for four people, with a double "V"-berth in the bow cabin and two straight settee berths in the main cabin. The galley is located on the port side just forward of the companionway ladder and is equipped with a sink.

Operational history
In a 2010 review Steve Henkel wrote, "Parker Dawson Yachts ... produced this out-of-the-ordinary craft, of which 50 or so were built from 1979 into the early 1980s. The split rig is unusual in a boat this small, since the configuration often means less total sail area. But in this case, the Poacher's sail area is higher than any of her comp[etitor]s ... Best features: The Poacher's shallow draft with board up gives her a good capability to explore beaches. She also has foam flotation. Worst features: Unlike the fin keels or centerboards of her comp[etitor]s, the Poacher has a daggerboard, and a rather deep one (4' 6") at that. The rudder is also the vertical-lifting type. We don't like vertically lifting blades, on the theory that in rocky shallows the system could result in severe damage to the daggerboard trunk and/or rudder assembly. Also, in addition to limiting total sail area, split rigs can be harder to trim properly, and therefore may be harder to sail, especially when going downwind."

See also
List of sailing boat types

References

External links
Photo of a Poacher 21

Keelboats
1970s sailboat type designs
Sailing yachts
Trailer sailers
Sailboat type designs by American designers
Sailboat types built by Parker Dawson Yachts